The 2002–03 Gamma Ethniki was the 20th season since the official establishment of the third tier of Greek football in 1983. Poseidon Neon Poron was crowned champion, thus winning promotion to Beta Ethniki. Ergotelis also won promotion as a runner-up, Levadiakos was also promoted after defeating Kavala 2-1 in a single play-off match at Alcazar Stadium in Larissa between the 14th placed team of Beta Ethniki and the 3rd placed team of Gamma Ethniki, and Niki Volos was administratively promoted due to the withdrawal of Ethnikos Olympiacos Volos from Beta Ethniki due to the debts.

Chania, Ethnikos Piraeus, Agios Nikolaos, Nafpaktiakos Asteras and Trikala were relegated to Delta Ethniki.

League table

Promotion play-off

Top scorers

References

Third level Greek football league seasons
3
Greece